Periglandula ipomoeae is a fungus of the genus Periglandula in the family Clavicipitaceae. It lives symbiotically with the plant Ipomoea asarifolia as an epibiont.

References 

Clavicipitaceae
Fungi described in 2011